Greenbrier High School (GHS) is a comprehensive public high school serving more than 600 students in grades ten through twelve in Greenbrier, Arkansas, United States. It is one of six public high schools in Faulkner County and is the sole high school administered by the Greenbrier School District. Greenbrier High School is the home of the pilot program that formed the national EAST Initiative.

Academics 
The school is accredited by the Arkansas Department of Education (ADE) and has been accredited by AdvancED (formerly North Central Association) since 1988.

Curriculum 
The assumed course of study follows the Smart Core curriculum developed the Arkansas Department of Education (ADE), which requires students to complete 22 credit units before graduation. Students engage in regular and Advanced Placement (AP) coursework and exams. Greerbrier is affiliated with the Conway Area Career Center to support the students' career and technical education needs.

Awards and recognition 
In 2011, Greenbrier School District and its high school were recognized in the AP District of the Year Awards program in the College Board's 2nd Annual Honor Roll that consisted of 367 U.S. public school districts (4 in Arkansas) that simultaneously achieved increases in access to AP® courses for a broader number of students and improved the rate at which their AP students earned scores of 3 or higher on an AP Exam.

Extracurricular activities 
The Greenbrier High School mascot is the panther with school colors of royal blue, black, and white.

Athletics 
The Greenbrier Panthers participate in various interscholastic activities in the 5A West Conference administered by the Arkansas Activities Association. The school athletic activities include baseball, basketball (boys/girls), soccer (boys/girls), bowling, competitive cheer, cross country (boys/girls), football, golf (boys/girls), softball, swimming and diving (girls), tennis (boys/girls), volleyball, and wrestling.

The girls basketball team won three consecutive state championships (1956, 1957, 1958) with a state-record team tournament points of 288 in 1958. In 1985, Brian Wiedower pitched the first perfect game in a state baseball tournament.

In 2012, Greenbrier won the state's Student Angler Federation (SAF) High School Fishing State Championship.

Clubs and traditions 

In 1995–96, first-year Greenbrier High School educator Tim Stephenson piloted a program that would go on to become the EAST (Environmental And Spatial Technologies) Initiative, which has grown to more than 200 high schools in Arkansas and other states.

Notable incidents
On March 14, 2018, during the 2018 United States gun violence protests, three students elected to receive corporal punishment in the form of two paddlings on the thighs for their participation in the walkout. This required parental consent, and was administered the same day.

References

External links 
 

Public high schools in Arkansas
Schools in Faulkner County, Arkansas